Mrs. Lydia McCaffery's Furnished Rooms, also known as the McCauley Lodging House and now known as the St. Patrick's House, is a former rooming house in Missoula, Montana. It is included in the Missoula Downtown Historic District.

It is a two-and-one-half story American Foursquare house.

References

Residential buildings completed in 1910
Residential buildings on the National Register of Historic Places in Montana
National Register of Historic Places in Missoula, Montana
1910 establishments in Montana
American Foursquare architecture